The Quilter Baronetcy, of Bawdsey Manor in Bawdsey in the County of Suffolk, is a title in the Baronetage of the United Kingdom. It was created on 13 September 1897 for the businessman and politician William Quilter. The second Baronet was also a politician.

Roger Quilter, younger son of the first Baronet, was a composer.

The family seat, Bawdsey Manor, was requisitioned by the Devonshire Regiment during the First World War and returned to the family afterwards, but was later sold to the Air Ministry in 1936 for a new research station for the development of radio direction finding. In June 2018 the family seat since the late 19th century, Sutton Hall in Suffolk, was for sale by Sir Guy Quilter for £31.5m with 2,177 acres.

Quilter baronets, of Bawdsey Manor (1897)
Sir William Cuthbert Quilter, 1st Baronet (1841–1911)
Sir (William Eley) Cuthbert Quilter, 2nd Baronet (1873–1952)
Sir (John) Raymond Cuthbert Quilter, 3rd Baronet (1902–1959). Quilter was an aviation enthusiast and manufacturer of static-line parachutes widely used by British troops during and after the Second World War.
Sir Anthony Raymond Leopold Cuthbert Quilter, 4th Baronet (1937–2014)
Sir Guy Raymond Cuthbert Quilter, 5th Baronet (born 1967).

The heir apparent to the baronetcy is the 5th Baronet's eldest son, William Raymond Cuthbert Quilter (born 1995).

References

Kidd, Charles, Williamson, David (editors). Debrett's Peerage and Baronetage (1990 edition). New York: St Martin's Press, 1990.

Quilter